Patrick Lloyd O'Brien (born  in Durban) is a South African rugby union player for the  in the Currie Cup and the Rugby Challenge. His regular position is lock or flanker. Great club and amateur performances have led to his Western Province sevens and Currie Cup debuts. He has since moved on to take up a provincial contract in Italy.

Career

O'Brien played club rugby at Western Province club sides Helderberg and Villager before being included in 's wider training group prior to the 2013 Currie Cup Premier Division. He failed to make an appearance for them, but joined Kimberley-based side  for that competition.

References

1989 births
Living people
Griquas (rugby union) players
Rugby union players from Durban
South African rugby union players
Western Province (rugby union) players
Rugby union flankers